NEAFL may refer to:
New England Australian Football League, in New England, Australia
North East Australian Football League, formed in 2010 from a merger of the Queensland Australian Football League and AFL Canberra
North Eastern Australian Football League, United States, which in 2005 merged with the South East Australian Football League to form the Eastern Australian Football League